Trachylepis cristinae, also known commonly as the Abd al Kuri skink, is a species of skink, a lizard in the family Scincidae. The species is endemic to Yemen.

Etymology
The specific name, cristinae, is in honor of herpetologist Cristina Grieco, who was one of the collectors of the holotype.

Geographic range
T. cristinae is found on the island of Abd al Kuri in Yemen.

Description

References

Further reading
Kwet A (2013). "Trachylepis cristinae ein neuer Skink von Sokotra". Terraria-Elaphe 2013 (4): 47. (in German).
Sindaco R, Metallinou M, Pupin F, Fasola M, Carranza S (2012). "Forgotten in the ocean: systematics, biogeography and evolution of the Trachylepis skinks of the Socotra Archipelago". Zoologica Scripta 41 (4): 346–362. (Trachylepis cristinae, new species).

Trachylepis
Reptiles described in 2012
Taxa named by Roberto Sindaco
Taxa named by Margarita Metallinou
Taxa named by Salvador Carranza